Cochylimorpha nipponana is a species of moth of the family Tortricidae. It is found in China (Heilongjiang, Shaanxi) and Japan.

References

Moths described in 1977
Cochylimorpha
Taxa named by Józef Razowski
Moths of Asia
Moths of Japan